Shaykh al-Hadith Noor Muhammad Islamjar is an Afghan Taliban politician who is currently serving as governor of Herat Province since 26 October 2021.

References

Living people
Taliban governors
Governors of Herat Province
Year of birth missing (living people)